AGZ may refer to:

  AGZ (Rapper) From Basildon, Essex, England
 Aggeneys Airport (IATA code), Aggeneys, Northern Cape, South Africa
 Antiquarische Gesellschaft in Zürich (Antiquarian Society of Zürich)
 Mount Iriga Agta language (ISO-639-3 code), a Bikol language spoken in the Philippines
 Volkswagen's 2.3 VR5 110-125 kW engine; see List of discontinued Volkswagen Group petrol engines